Chanuces is one of thirteen parishes (administrative divisions) in Quirós, a municipality within the province and autonomous community of the Principality of Asturias, in northern Spain.

The population is 37.

Villages
 Chanuces
 El Grandizu
 La Cereizal
 Murias

References 

Parishes in Quirós